Hypopta clymene is a moth in the family Cossidae. It is found in Guatemala.

The wingspan is about 40 mm. The costal margin of the forewings is pale buff with some black striae. The base and medial space below the cell to the inner margin is brown, with some fuscous 
lines on the inner margin and a larger subbasal black spot on the costa. The hindwings are dark grey with a whitish costa.

References

Natural History Museum Lepidoptera generic names catalog

Hypopta
Moths described in 1921